Everything Put Together is a 2000 drama film directed by Marc Forster starring Radha Mitchell, Megan Mullally and Louis Ferreira. The story focuses on a Californian couple expecting a child and their group of friends who are confronted with the tragedy of a big loss. 

The film premiered at the 2000 Sundance Film Festival and later received a limited theatrical release in North America on November 2, 2001.

Plot
Angie and Russ, a couple in an affluent California suburb, are expecting a baby. The couple excitedly prepares for impending parenthood by celebrating with their closest friends, including Angie’s girlfriends Judith and Barbie, both of whom are also expecting. Angie and Russ’ bliss is abruptly shattered with an unexpected loss when their newborn succumbs to SIDS. As Angie spirals into depression from her grief, she finds herself ostracized by Judith and Barbie, who assume she wants solitude to deal with the loss.

Cast
Radha Mitchell as Angie
Megan Mullally as Barbie
Louis Ferreira as Russ
Matt Malloy as Dr. Reiner
Mark Boone Junior as Bill
Catherine Lloyd Burns as Judith
Michele Hicks as April
Alan Ruck as Kessel

Production 
The film, which is Forster's directorial debut, was shot in two weeks on a digital camera on a budget of less than $10,000. 

Everything Put Together premiered at the 2000 Sundance Film Festival, where it garnered comparisons to films like Rosemary's Baby. The distribution arm of American Cinematheque picked up the film and released it in a limited rollout that nearly coincided with the release of Forster's follow-up, Monster's Ball.

Critical reception 
On Rotten Tomatoes, the film has an approval rating of 69% based on 29 reviews. 

Emanuel Levy of Variety called it a "riveting, haunting chronicle" and praised Mitchell's performance. He noted the film's weakest aspects, such as the development of characters besides Angie's, "are almost overcome by Forster’s bravura visual style, endowing a rather familiar story with a fresh, bold treatment."

Stephen Holden of The New York Times critiqued the film’s tonal clashes, noting that on one level, the film plays as a "sober educational seminar on sudden infant death syndrome,” while on another level, "it is a psychological horror film that follows Angie's descent into a clinical depression accompanied by scary delusional fantasies." Holden said the film was most effective in its "expressionistic critique of the suburban baby culture and its joys, fears and fetishes. Its satirically edged view of a group of pregnant women preparing for motherhood recalls the creepy scenes of suburban togetherness in Todd Haynes's film Safe", adding, "If the movie's horror effects lend Everything Put Together an aura of creepiness, the scenes that hurt most are those in which she runs into old friends who can barely stifle their panic as they seek to flee her contaminating presence."

Owen Gleiberman of Entertainment Weekly was more critical and gave the film a grade of "B-", writing the film "is too responsible to erupt into the kind of operatic maternal horror it keeps threatening the audience with."

Accolades

At the 2001 Independent Spirit Awards, Forster won the Someone to Watch Award and was nominated for the John Cassavetes Award for Best Feature Under $500,000.

References

External links

2000 films
2000 independent films
Films directed by Marc Forster
2000 directorial debut films
American drama films
2000 drama films
American pregnancy films
2000s pregnancy films
Films about grieving
Films about child death
Films about depression
2000s English-language films
2000s American films